
Gmina Suchedniów is an urban-rural gmina (administrative district) in Skarżysko County, Świętokrzyskie Voivodeship, in south-central Poland.

The gmina contains parts of the protected areas called Sieradowice Landscape Park and Suchedniów-Oblęgorek Landscape Park.

Villages
Apart from the town of Suchedniów, Gmina Suchedniów contains the villages and settlements of Krzyżka, Michniów, Mostki and Ostojów.

Neighbouring gminas
Gmina Suchedniów is bordered by the town of Skarżysko-Kamienna and by the gminas of Bliżyn, Bodzentyn, Łączna and Wąchock.

References
Polish official population figures 2006

Suchedniow
Skarżysko County